Kevin Burgess  is a British chemist who has been Rachal Professor of Chemistry at Texas A&M University since 2004.

He was educated at the University of Bath (BSc, 1979), the University of East Anglia (MSc, 1980) and Darwin College, Cambridge (PhD, 1983). He received the Pedler Award of the Royal Society of Chemistry in 2013 and was made a Fellow in the same year. He has an h-index of 81 according to Google Scholar.

References

Year of birth missing (living people)
Living people
British chemists
Alumni of the University of Bath
Alumni of the University of East Anglia
Alumni of Darwin College, Cambridge
Rice University faculty
Texas A&M University faculty
Fellows of the Royal Society of Chemistry